"Love Like Blood" is a song by English rock band Killing Joke. It was released in January 1985 as the second single from their fifth studio album, Night Time (1985). Produced by Chris Kimsey, the song is characterised as gothic rock and new wave. It was a top 10 hit in the Netherlands, Belgium and New Zealand and peaked at number 16 in the United Kingdom.

"Love Like Blood" was originally released by E.G. Records in January 1985 as a 12" in the UK, and a 12" maxi single in Germany. The 7" single on E.G. was released in the UK, the Netherlands and Germany. Polydor also released a 12" single in the Netherlands and a 12" maxi single in France.

"Love Like Blood" remains very fondly remembered in the Netherlands, as it has appeared on the country's annual Top 2000 songs of all time countdown every year since 2011. Its highest position was No. 931 in 2017.

Track listings 
The single release was a shorter edit of "Love Like Blood" than the full album track. The 12" single featured an extended mix, titled "Love Like Blood (Version)" as its A-side. An alternative 12" release, limited to 2000 copies, replaced this with a dub remix, known as the "Gestalt Mix". "Blue Feather (Version)" was featured as the B-side; an instrumental mix of a song that was otherwise unreleased, until the complete version was included on the re-issue of Night Time in 2008.

In 1998, "Love Like Blood" was reissued as a live remix 12" single by Butterfly Records, alongside a remix of the song "Intellect" from Killing Joke’s 11th studio album, Democracy.

7" vinyl single 
Side A
 "Love Like Blood" – 04:14

Side B
 "Blue Feather (Version)" – 04:09

12" vinyl single 
Side A
 "Love Like Blood (Version)" – 06:42

Side B
 "Love Like Blood" – 04:14
 "Blue Feather (Version)" – 04:09

Limited Gestalt Mix 12" single 
Side A
 "Love Like Blood (Gestalt Mix)" – 05:05

Side B
 "Love Like Blood" – 04:14
 "Blue Feather (Version)" – 04:09

Charts

Weekly charts

Year-end charts

Covers 
"Love Like Blood" was covered by several bands, and the German gothic rock band Love Like Blood took their name from this song.

Dead by April version

In 2010, Swedish alternative metal band Dead by April released a cover version of "Love Like Blood" as a stand-alone single on 10 May 2010 on iTunes and as a double A-side single alongside previously released track "Promise Me" from their eponymous debut album. No music videos were made for either of the tracks. "Love Like Blood" was the first track recorded by the band with their new singer Zandro Santiago, and was later included on their compilation album Stronger, released on 24 January 2011.

Digital single

Other versions

References

External links 

Love Like Blood TOTP
Love Like Blood music video

Killing Joke songs
1985 singles
Song recordings produced by Chris Kimsey
Dead by April songs
Songs written by Jaz Coleman
Songs written by Paul Ferguson
Songs written by Paul Raven (musician)
Songs written by Geordie Walker
E.G. Records singles
Polydor Records singles
1984 songs